The Iloilo State University of Science and Technology is a government research university located at Tiwi, Barotac Nuevo, Iloilo, Philippines.

History

ISUST was established on 16 June 1947 as Barotac Nuevo Junior High School, which was opened for the first and second year. It held its first commencement exercises on 25 March 1949. On 22 June 1957, it was converted into Central Iloilo National School of Fisheries (CINSOF) by virtue of RA 1925. On 19 June 1961, it was renamed Iloilo National School of Fisheries (INSOF) and, on 20 June 1963, it was converted into Iloilo Regional School of Fisheries (IRSOF) by virtue of RA 3521. On 21 August 1978, then President Ferdinand Marcos signed PD 1523 converting IRSOF into Iloilo State College of Fisheries (ISCOF). On 22 August 2000, RA 8760 and CHED Memorandum Nos. 27 and 27-A integrated CHED-Supervised Institutions (CSIs) of Barotac Nuevo, Dingle, Dumangas, and San Enrique, Iloilo into the system. On 11 June 2013, President Benigno Aquino III signed RA 10604 converting Iloilo State College of Fisheries into Iloilo State University of Science and Technology.

Mandate

It is mandated to provide advanced education, higher technological, professional instruction and training in fisheries technology, arts and sciences, education, industrial technology, engineering, aquaculture, seaweed farming, and other related fields of study relevant to national development. It undertakes research, extension services and production activities in support of the development of the Iloilo Province and provide progressive leadership in its areas of specialisation.

Colleges

ISUST consists five colleges that provide instruction in basic education all the way up to the post-graduate levels. In the undergraduate and graduate levels, its covered disciplines include the Computer Studies, Education, Fisheries, HRM, Marine Biology, Nautical Studies, and Tourism. Its School of Graduate Studies offers Master in Instructional Leadership (English, Social Science, Science, and Mathematics), Master in Local Governance, Master of Arts in Educational Management, Master in Fisheries Technology, Doctor of Rural Development, Doctor of Fisheries Technology, and Doctor of Philosophy (Educational Technology).

Founder

Dr Ferjenel Biron, a Barotacnoan himself, is the Founding Father of the University under RA 10604. The University main campus is shared by ISUST at Poblacion (ISUST-Main Poblacion) in J.T. Bretana Street, yet the ISUST at Tiwi (ISUST-Main Tiwi) remains the biggest campus of the ISUST System.

Presidents

Other External Campuses

ISUST has other campuses: the Iloilo State University of Science and Technology at Dingle (ISUST-Dingle), the Iloilo State University of Science and Technology at Dumangas (ISUST-Dumangas),and the Iloilo State University of Science and Technology at San Enrique (ISUST-San Enrique) - all in Iloilo, West Visayas, Philippines.

Basic Education

The Fisheries and Marine Science High School is ISUST's laboratory high school and complies with the country's K-12 education.

References

Universities and colleges in Iloilo